Chan Seng Onn (born January 1954) is a Singaporean judge. He has served as a High Court judge since 2 July 2007.

Early life and education 
Chan Seng Onn was born in Singapore in January 1954 as the youngest of three children, with two sisters. His mother was a housewife and his father worked as a sewage pump attendant. He studied at St Anthony's Boys' School and then St Joseph's Institution (SJI) where he did his GCE O-Level and A-Level exams. He was a top student alongside future politicians Teo Chee Hean and George Yeo at SJI.

As a President's and Colombo Plan scholar, he graduated with a bachelor's degree in engineering from University College London in 1976. He received a master's degree in industrial engineering from National University of Singapore (NUS) in 1981, and a Diploma in Business Administration from NUS. He received his Bachelor of Laws from NUS in 1986 and Master of Laws from University of Cambridge in 1987.

Legal career 
In 1987, he joined the Singapore Legal Service as State Counsel and Deputy Public Prosecutor in the Attorney-General's Chambers (AGC). He was appointed Senior Assistant Registrar to the Supreme Court in 1991. In 1994, he returned to AGC in the role of Senior State Counsel. On 15 October 1997, he was appointed Judicial Commissioner. 

In April 2000, as Judicial Commissioner, Chan heard the case of 33-year-old Vincent Lee Chuan Leong, one of the three kidnappers and mastermind of the abduction of a 14-year-old girl for ransom in September 1999. Chan, in his judgement, noted Lee have no criminal records, and during the course of the kidnapping, he did not harm the girl and treated her well save for the trauma the victim gone through, and thus he decided that the death penalty was inappropriate, and instead sentenced Lee to life imprisonment. Subsequently, the other two kidnappers Shi Song Jing and Zhou Jian Guang, who were illegal immigrants from China, were also sentenced to life in prison by another judge Tay Yong Kwang during a separate trial.

In June 2001, Chan returned to AGC as Solicitor-General. In that same year itself, he was appointed Senior Counsel. On 2 July 2007, he was sworn in as a High Court judge by President S. R. Nathan at the Istana.

One of the cases which Chan presided as High Court judge was the 2008 Yishun triple murders, in which he sentenced the killer to death in 2012 for the murder of one of the three victims while finding him guilty of culpable homicide for killing the two other victims. Chan's decision to pass the death sentence was upheld by the Court of Appeal of Singapore in 2014 when the killer tried to appeal the verdict (which was rejected), although the appellate court also amended the double culpable homicide convictions to murder based on the fact that the convict was not mentally unsound when he killed the other two victims.

Chan was also the judge who sentenced Ipoh-born Malaysian Nagaenthran K. Dharmalingam to death after finding him guilty of drug trafficking. Nagaenthran was originally set to be hanged on 10 November 2021 after serving 11 years on death row. However, a day before his scheduled hanging, Nagaenthran was discovered to be infected with COVID-19 and thus his execution was suspended, with the courts allowing him time to recover and Nagaenthran himself had also appealed to reduce his sentence. The appeal was dismissed on 29 March 2022, and he was executed on 27 April 2022.

References 

Judges of the Supreme Court of Singapore
Judicial Commissioners of Singapore
Solicitors-General of Singapore
Alumni of University College London
1954 births
Living people